Beiliu (北流) is a city in Guangxi, China.

Beiliu may also refer to:

 Beiliu, Shanxi (北留镇), a town in Yangcheng County, Shanxi
 Beiliu River (北流河), Guangxi